Legends of the Hidden Temple (also known as Legends of the Hidden Temple: The Movie) is a 2016 adventure television film inspired by the mid-1990s game show of the same name. The film follows three siblings who ditch a jungle tour and find themselves undergoing a real-life obstacle course with the help of Kirk Fogg and Olmec. It premiered on Nickelodeon on November 26, 2016.

Plot 
Three siblings, teenager Sadie (Isabela Moner) and her kid brothers Noah (Colin Critchley) and Dudley (Jet Jurgensmeyer), are vacationing in Mexico with their parents, who allow them to visit the Hidden Temple theme park on their own where Kirk Fogg now works as a tour guide. Noah, being fascinated by the legends of the Hidden Temple, which he believes are real, wishes he could explore it on the inside, but Fogg reveals the Temple was closed to the public following an incident years earlier. Impressed by Noah's knowledge about the Temple, Fogg gives him a map he found inside. Much to Sadie's annoyance, Noah and Dudley sneak into the restricted area where the secret entrance is believed to be. Sadie tries to stop them, but accidentally steps on the trapdoor that sends them into the temple.

The kids are welcomed inside the temple by none other than Olmec (Dee Bradley Baker), who was once a king. He recalls of a moment in his life, then tells them what he remembers. He planned to decree his good son, Prince Zuma, as a successor to the kingdom, when suddenly his evil son Thak and his army of Temple Guards appeared and attempted to kill Zuma and insediate Thak as king. So Olmec had no choice but to turn the entire civilization to stone. Noah believes that he, Sadie and Dudley are the only ones who can restore the kingdom back to its former glory. Olmec instructs them to find both half-pendants of life in the Room of the Ancient Warriors and the Treasure Room, but warns them of the dangers that might lurk around the temple. Once both half-pendants are found, they must be combined to unlock the Temple and then exit within three minutes, otherwise the three siblings will risk being trapped inside the Temple forever.

Cast 
 Isabela Moner as Sadie
 Colin Critchley as Noah	
 Jet Jurgensmeyer as Dudley	
 Kirk Fogg as himself
 Daniel Cudmore as Thak
 Michael Benyaer as King Olmec
 Ioan Sebastian Tirlui as Zuma
 Catia Ojeda as Mom
 David Michie as Dad
 Dee Bradley Baker as Voice of Olmec
 James Black as Tourist
 Jon Molerio as Sargento Primedo
 Oscar Torre as Crew Leader
 Greg Cromer as Chet
 Crystal as Mikey the Monkey
 Squire as Mikey Understudy

Production 
Jet Jurgensmeyer was cast as Dudley, the youngest of the three siblings, who has the ability to talk to all animals except snakes. Kirk Fogg, the original host of Legends of the Hidden Temple, the 1990s game show on which the film is based, returns as a fictionalized version of himself, working as a tour guide. Colin Critchley and Isabela Moner also appear in the film. Voice actor Dee Bradley Baker, who is also from the original game show, reprised his role as Olmec.

Ratings 
Legends of the Hidden Temple attracted a total of 1.60 million viewers with a 0.29 rating for people aged 18–49.

References

External links 
 Official website
 

2016 television films
2016 films
Films based on game shows
Films set in Mexico
Nickelodeon original films